The Tsingy tufted-tailed rat (Eliurus antsingy) is a species of rodent in the family Nesomyidae. It is endemic to western and northern Madagascar, and has been observed mainly in dry forest. As a result of deforestation, the habitat of E. antsingy is at risk.

References

Mammals of Madagascar
Eliurus
Mammals described in 2001
Taxa named by Michael D. Carleton